The Buffalo Gap Cheyenne River Bridge, in Custer County, South Dakota near Buffalo Gap, South Dakota, was built in 1932.  It was listed on the National Register of Historic Places in 1988.

It connected Custer County to the west and the Pine Ridge Indian Reservation to the east.

The bridge was replaced in 2014.

References

Parker truss bridges in the United States
National Register of Historic Places in Custer County, South Dakota
Buildings and structures completed in 1932